Shamen is an interchange metro station of Zhengzhou Metro Line 2 and Line 4.

Station layout

Exits

References 

Stations of Zhengzhou Metro
Line 2, Zhengzhou Metro
Line 4, Zhengzhou Metro
Railway stations in China opened in 2016